Nicholas Scott Lachey (born November 9, 1973) is an American singer, actor, television personality, and host. He rose to fame as the lead singer of the multi-platinum-selling boyband 98 Degrees, and later starred in the reality series Newlyweds: Nick and Jessica with his then-wife, Jessica Simpson. He has released four solo albums: SoulO, What's Left of Me, A Father's Lullaby, and Soundtrack of My Life. He also had a recurring role on the television series Charmed. He hosted NBC's The Sing-Off, co-hosted VH1's Big Morning Buzz Live from 2014 to 2015, and Nickelodeon's America's Most Musical Family, and co-hosts the Netflix shows Love Is Blind and The Ultimatum with his wife Vanessa Lachey. He is also the sole host of Perfect Match for Netflix.  In 2021, Lachey won the fifth season of The Masked Singer.

Early life
Lachey was born in Harlan, Kentucky, to Cathalyn (née Fopma) and John Lachey. He is the brother of singer and actor Drew Lachey, alongside whom he has worked closely. His maternal grandfather, Robert James Fopma, was of Dutch descent. Nick's other ancestry is English, Scottish, German, and distant Welsh and French. He attended Clovernook Elementary School in the Cincinnati suburb of North College Hill, Ohio and the School for Creative and Performing Arts in Cincinnati. He attended Miami University in Oxford, Ohio, where he joined Sigma Alpha Epsilon. In the fall of 1992, he enrolled at the University of Southern California, according to a statement he made during his guest appearance on The Arsenio Hall how on December 12, 2013.

Career
Lachey started his professional singing career at Kings Island with friend Justin Jeffre in the mid-1990s singing in a group quartet throughout the park. Lachey was a member of boyband 98 Degrees along with his brother, Drew, Justin Jeffre, and Jeff Timmons. Their debut album was the self-titled 98 Degrees; however, the band's first real success came with their follow-up album 98 Degrees and Rising. 98 Degrees has sold over 10 million records. 98 Degrees performed a one-off summer reunion show in Hershey, Pennsylvania, at the Summer Mixtape Festival on August 18, 2012, their first concert in more than a decade.

During the summer of 2003, the reality show Newlyweds: Nick and Jessica, starring Lachey and then-wife Jessica Simpson, began airing on MTV. The couple starred in the television special The Nick and Jessica Variety Hour, which aired in 2004 and was compared to The Sonny & Cher Show. In 2005, Newlyweds won a People's Choice Award for Favorite Reality Show before wrapping shortly after. On November 11, 2003, his solo debut album, SoulO, was released. Despite being released during the success of Newlyweds, the album was a commercial failure. Lachey took a recurring role on series Charmed between 2004 and 2005.

What's Left of Me was released on May 9, 2006 and debuted at number two on the Billboard 200. The album was certified Gold, after selling more than 500,000 copies domestically. The first single from the album was the title track, "What's Left of Me", released on February 21, 2006. The song became a hit, reaching a peak position of number six on the Billboard Hot 100. The video for "What's Left Of Me" featured former MTV VJ, Vanessa Minnillo. Lachey recorded "Ordinary Day" for the Oprah Winfrey-produced film, For One More Day. Lachey began working on his third solo album in 2007. Lachey also starred in a well known TV series, One Tree Hill, as a singer at Red Bedroom Productions. It was announced in January 2010 that Jive Records had put his new album on hold indefinitely. In June 2010, Lachey confirmed that he had parted ways with Jive Records.

Taking the Stage, a musical reality show documenting the lives of high school students at the School for Creative and Performing Arts, premiered on MTV in March 2009. It was produced by Lachey. In December 2009, he hosted The Sing-Off, a four-part American singing competition featuring a cappella groups, a role he reprised during December 2010 for the show's second and third season on NBC. Lachey was a contestant in the NBC celebrity reality competition series called Stars Earn Stripes.

On January 16, 2014, VH1 announced Lachey would resume hosting Big Morning Buzz Live, upon its return on March 3, 2014. On September 6, 2017, Lachey was announced as one of the celebrities who will take part on the 25th season of Dancing with the Stars, competing against his wife Vanessa. He was paired with professional dancer Peta Murgatroyd. Murgatroyd's husband, Maksim Chmerkovskiy, was paired with Vanessa.  On October 23, Lachey and Murgatroyd were the fifth couple to be eliminated from the competition, leaving in ninth place.

Lachey hosted a musical competition on Nickelodeon titled America's Most Musical Family which premiered November 1, 2019. 

Lachey and his wife currently co-host the Netflix reality shows Love Is Blind and The Ultimatum: Marry or Move On. Lachey also hosts Perfect Match for Netflix, solo.

Other ventures
Lachey is part owner of the Hollywood Fame, a team in the American Basketball Association that began play in fall 2006, and was part of an ownership group of the Tacoma Rainiers, the Seattle Mariners' Triple-A affiliate. Lachey is also a die-hard Cincinnati Bengals, Cincinnati Reds and Cincinnati Bearcats fan. On April 7, 2009, Lachey threw out the ceremonial first pitch for the MLB Opening Day game in Cincinnati, Ohio. On July 9, 2011 Lachey sang the National Anthem for the inaugural NASCAR Sprint Cup Series race at Kentucky Speedway in Sparta, Kentucky.

Lachey was among a group of investors that placed a marijuana legalization initiative on the Ohio ballot in 2015.  The initiative sought exclusive grow rights for the group members while prohibiting all other cultivation except small amounts for personal use.  Lachey appeared in a TV ad advocating for passage of the initiative, but it was ultimately defeated.

Lachey is on the Entertainment Council of the hunger-relief organization Feeding America.

In 2021, Lachey competed on season five of The Masked Singer as "Piglet". He was declared the winner of the season.

Personal life

In December 1998, Lachey and fellow singer Jessica Simpson were introduced by their shared manager at a Christmas event. They subsequently began dating after meeting again at a Teen People event in January 1999, but broke up for five months beginning in April 2001 until getting back together following the September 11 attacks. They became engaged in February 2002, and married on October 26, 2002, in Austin, Texas. In November 2005, after months of tabloid speculation, Lachey and Simpson announced they were separating. Simpson filed for divorce on December 16, 2005, citing "irreconcilable differences". The couple's divorce was publicized worldwide and was reportedly finalized on June 30, 2006.

Soon after the release of "What's Left of Me", Lachey's 2006 music video starring Vanessa Minnillo, he and Minnillo began dating. They briefly broke up in June 2009, but by October 2009, Lachey confirmed that they were back together after having been "single for a minute". Lachey and Minnillo became engaged in November 2010, and married on July 15, 2011, on Sir Richard Branson's private Necker Island in the British Virgin Islands. The wedding was filmed and televised on TLC. They have three children, two sons and a daughter.

Lachey is a fan of the Cincinnati Bengals. He was kicked out of a game in 2012 against the San Diego Chargers after an altercation with another fan.

Discography

98 Degrees 
 98° (1997)
 98° and Rising (1998)
 Revelation (2000)
 2.0 (2013)

Solo albums 
 SoulO (2003) 
 What's Left of Me (2006) 
 A Father's Lullaby (2013) 
 Soundtrack of My Life (2014)

Filmography

Awards and nominations
ASCAP Pop Music Awards

|-
| 2007
| "What's Left of Me"
| Most Performed Song
| 

American Music Awards

|-
|2006
|Himself
|Favorite Male Pop/Rock Artist
|

Groovevolt Music and Fashion Awards

|-
| rowspan=2|2007
| What's Left of Me
| Best Pop Album - Male
| rowspan=2 
|-
| "What's Left of Me"
| Best Pop Song Performance - Male

MTV Video Music Awards

|-
|2006
|What's Left of Me
|Best Male Video
|

Teen Choice Awards

|-
| 2000
| "Where You Are" (with Jessica Simpson)
| Choice Music: Love Song
| 
|-
| 2003
| rowspan=2|Newlyweds: Nick and Jessica
| Choice TV: Reality Hunk
|rowspan=4 
|-
| 2004
| Choice TV: Reality/Variety Star - Male
|-
| rowspan=2|2005
| rowspan=4|Himself
| Choice TV: Personality - Male
|-
| rowspan=2|Choice Red Carpet Fashion Icon: Male
|-
| rowspan=3|2006
| 
|-
| Choice Hottie: Male
| 
|-
| "What's Left of Me "
| Choice Music: Love Song
|

References

External links
 
 
 

 
1973 births
20th-century American singers
21st-century American singers
98 Degrees members
American contemporary R&B singers
American dance musicians
American male film actors
American male singers
American people of Dutch descent
American people of English descent
American people of German descent
American people of French descent
American people of Irish descent
American people of Scottish descent
American people of Welsh descent
American pop rock singers
American soul singers
American tenors
Jive Records artists
Living people
Male actors from Cincinnati
Male actors from Kentucky
Miami University alumni
Musicians from Cincinnati
People from Harlan, Kentucky
Participants in American reality television series
Singers from Ohio
Singers from Kentucky
Songwriters from Kentucky
University of Southern California alumni
United Service Organizations entertainers
Masked Singer winners